Garai is a surname of multiple origins. Garai is a Basque surname that appeared in Sopuerta (Vizcaya), that means "peak" or "height". Garai is also common Bengali and Hungarian surnames.

List
Notable people with this surname include:

 Aritz López Garai (born 1980), Spanish footballer
 Dorothy Garai (died 1438), Hungarian noblewoman who became Queen of Bosnia
 Fernando Lamikiz Garai, a Basque lawyer
 Ladislaus Garai (c. 1410–1459), Palatine of Hungary
 Laszlo Garai, a Hungarian economist and academic
 Nicholas I Garai (c. 1325–1386), Palatine of Hungary
 Nicholas II Garai (1367–1433), Palatine of Hungary
 Romola Garai (born 1982), English actress

See also
 The House of Garai
 Garay (surname)

References

Hungarian-language surnames
Basque-language surnames